The Ohio House, or Ohio State Building, is a historic building located in west Fairmount Park, Philadelphia. The house was built from various Ohio sandstones and functioned as the Ohio state exhibit for the Centennial Exposition of 1876. The only other extant exposition structures are Memorial Hall and two small comfort stations; the building is the only extant state exhibit remaining from the exposition.  The house was restored for the Bicentennial Celebration in 1976, and leased to Ohio House Partners by the Fairmount Park Historic Preservation Trust in 2006. After extensive restoration, the building was opened to the public in November 2007 and has since functioned as a cafe, event venue and offices.

The Ohio House is listed on the Philadelphia Register of Historic Places and is an inventoried structure within the Fairmount Park Historic District entry on the National Register of Historic Places.

See also

 List of houses in Fairmount Park
 National Register of Historic Places listings in West Philadelphia - an inventoried structure within the Fairmount Park listing

References

External links 

Houses in Fairmount Park
Centennial Exposition
Philadelphia Register of Historic Places
West Fairmount Park
Gothic Revival architecture in Pennsylvania
Houses on the National Register of Historic Places in Philadelphia
Historic American Buildings Survey in Philadelphia
World's fair architecture in Pennsylvania
1876 in Ohio
Ohio culture